Alecto is one of the Erinyes (Furies) in Greek mythology.

Family and description
According to Hesiod, Alecto was the daughter of Gaea fertilized by the blood spilled from Uranus when Cronus castrated him. She is the sister of Tisiphone and Megaera. These three Furies had snakes for hair and blood dripped from their eyes, while their wings were those of bats. Alecto's job as a Fury is castigating the moral crimes (such as anger) of humans, especially if they are against others.

Alecto's function is similar to Nemesis, with the difference that Nemesis's function is to castigate crimes against the gods, not mortals. Her punishment for mortals was Madness.

In mythology
In Virgil's Aeneid (Book VII),  Juno commanded the Fury Allecto (spelled with two l's) to prevent the Trojans from having their way with King Latinus by marriage or besiege Italian borders. Allecto's mission is to wreak havoc on the Trojans and cause their downfall through war. To do this, Allecto takes over the body of Queen Amata, who clamors for all of the Latin mothers to riot against the Trojans. She disguises herself as Juno's priestess Calybe and appears to Turnus in a dream persuading him to begin the war against the Trojans. Met with a mocking response from Turnus, Alecto abandons persuasion and attacks Turnus with a torch, causing his blood to "boil with the passion for war". Unsatisfied with her work in igniting the war, Allecto asks Juno if she can provoke more strife by drawing in bordering towns. Juno replies that she will manage the rest of the war herself: "You're roving far too freely, high on the heavens' winds, and the Father, king of steep Olympus, won't allow it. You must give way. Whatever struggle is still to come, I'll manage it myself."

In culture

Literature 
 Alecto appears in Book VII of Virgil's Aeneid.
 She briefly appears in Canto IX of Dante's Inferno with her sisters before the gates of Dis, threatening to unveil the Medusa.
 Alecto is invoked in John Dryden's adaptation of Oedipus Rex.
 She is mentioned multiple times in Miklós Zrínyi's The Siege of Sziget.
 Alecto is the name of a character in Tamsyn Muir's The Locked Tomb science fiction series.

Music 
 The musical piece "Music for a While" by Purcell is based on the aforementioned passage from Dryden's Oedipus. 
 She is mentioned in Handel's Rinaldo HWV 7 in the Aria "Sibillar gli angui d'Aletto" ("The hissing of Alecto's serpents").

Astronomy 
 Minor planet 465 Alekto is named in her honor.

Video games 
 In the video game God of War: Ascension, in which she is one of the three main antagonists, the Furies.
 In the video game Hades, she is one of three possible area bosses preventing Zagreus from leaving Tartarus.

See also
 Family tree of the Greek gods

References

Greek goddesses
Deities in the Aeneid
Furies/Erinyes
Underworld goddesses